El Carmen de Viboral is a town and municipality in the Colombian department of Antioquia. It is part of the subregion of Eastern Antioquia. El Carmen de Viboral is a small town that specializes in ceramics. Many shops allow visitors to see how ceramics and other handicrafts are made.

Ceramics
El Carmen de Viboral is well known for its handcraft ceramics. Which date back to the 19th century (1870-1880) when Eliseo Pareja arrived and found the richness of the region in terms of feldspar and quartz, which are fundamental minerals in the fabrication of ceramics. The ceramics of El Carmen de Viboral combined the indigenous and Spaniard tradition plus the American aspirations. They are unique to the region and the world. No two ceramic pieces are the same, as everything is uniquely hand painted.

References

Municipalities of Antioquia Department